4 Play is an album by trombonist Craig Harris' band Cold Sweat which was recorded in 1990 and released on the JMT label.

Reception
The AllMusic review by Scott Yanow stated "Mixing together avant-garde players with funksters, the music is somewhat strange, disturbing, and ultimately a bore".

Track listing
All compositions by Craig Harris except as indicated
 "Foreplay One" - 0:49
 "You Are Everything" (Linda Creed, Thom Bell) - 4:49
 "'Round Midnight" (Thelonious Monk) - 6:13
 "Spinning Around" (Don McPherson, Luther Simmons, Enrique Sylvester) - 3:49
 "Foreplay Two" - 0:43
 "If This World Were Mine" (Marvin Gaye) - 5:44
 "The Secret Garden" (El Debarge, Quincy Jones, Rod Temperton, Siedah Garrett) - 3:13
 "Foreplay Three" - 0:42
 "Going in Circles" (Anita Poree, Jerry Peters) - 4:46
 "In the Rain" (Tony Hester) - 3:33
 "Whip Appeal" (Babyface, Perri "Pebbles" Reid) - 5:30
 "Nefertiti" (Wayne Shorter) - 1:02
 "La-La (Means I Love You)" (Thom Bell, William Hart) - 4:21
 "Foreplay Four" - 0:47

Personnel
Craig Harris - trombone
Eddie Allen - trumpet
Sam Furnace - alto saxophone, baritone saxophone, flute
Booker T. Williams, George Adams - tenor saxophone
Brandon Ross, Fred Wells - electric guitar
Douglas Booth - keyboards
James Calloway (tracks 2, 3 & 6), Melvin Gibbs (tracks 4, 9, 10 & 13) - electric bass
Damon Mendez - drums
Kweyao Agyapon - percussion (track 4)
Andy Bey (tracks 3 & 9), Sekou Sundiata (tracks 5, 8 & 14) - vocals

References 

1991 albums
Craig Harris albums
JMT Records albums
Winter & Winter Records albums